The Wilson Range,  el. , is a small mountain range in the northeast corner of Glacier National Park (U.S.) in Glacier County, Montana that parallels the international boundary with Canada.  The range was named for Lt. Charles William Wilson (1836–1905) who was secretary to the British Boundary Commission (1858–1862).

See also
 List of mountain ranges in Montana
 Mountains and mountain ranges of Glacier National Park (U.S.)

Notes

Mountain ranges of Montana
Landforms of Glacier County, Montana